Primera División de Costa Rica (Costa Rica First Division) is a Costa Rican football tournament composed of two short tournaments that take up the entire year to determine the champion of Costa Rican football.

In both the Apertura and Clausura, 2 groups of 6 teams are conformed, they will play twice (Home and away) with the teams of their own group (10 games) and once game with the teams of the other group (6 games), for a total of 16 games. The top 4 teams from each group after the final round of the Apertura and the Clausura qualify for the playoffs.

Apertura 2006

Group stage

Playoffs

Clausura 2007

Group stage

Playoffs

Final
No Final was played as Saprissa won both the Apertura and Clausura tournaments.

Aggregate table

References

Liga FPD seasons
1
Costa